Irreligion in Saudi Arabia is difficult to measure as it is illegal to leave the Islamic faith in the country. Most atheists in Saudi Arabia communicate with each other via the internet.

According to a 2012 poll by WIN-Gallup International, 5% of 502 Saudi Arabians surveyed stated they were "convinced atheists".

In March 2014, the Saudi interior ministry had issued a royal decree branding all atheists as terrorists, which defines terrorism as "calling for atheist thought in any form, or calling into question the fundamentals of the Islamic religion on which this country is based."

Apostasy is punishable by death in Saudi Arabia.

Notable irreligious Saudis
 Abdullah al-Qasemi – Saudi Arabian 20th-century writer and intellectual. Former Salafist who became atheist and rejected organized religion.
 Rana Ahmad – Saudi Arabian refugee in Germany, author, women's rights activist and founder of the Atheist Refugee Relief
 Rahaf Mohammed – Saudi Arabian refugee in Canada whose January 2019 flight attracted international attention and involved diplomatic intervention.
 Hamza Kashgari – Saudi poet and a former columnist for the Saudi daily newspaper Al-Bilad.

See also
 Persecution of atheists in Islamic countries
 Persecution of atheists in the Middle East
 Religion in Saudi Arabia
 Freedom of religion in Saudi Arabia
 Apostasy in Islam

References

Further reading
 

Saudi Arabia
Saudi Arabia
Saudi Arabia
Religion in Saudi Arabia
Criticism of atheism